Santi Prunati (1652 or 1656 – 27 November 1728) was an Italian painter of the Baroque era, born and mainly active in Verona.

Biography
He was born to Antonio Prunati, and baptized by September 22. Originally studied with a painter by the name of Voltolino, then with Biagio Falcieri. At age 19, he traveled to Vicenza to paint in the choir of San Jacopo and paint an altarpiece depicting St Antony of Padua for the church of San Felice. He then traveled to Venice to work in the studio of Giovanni Carlo Loth.

He then traveled to Bologna to paint in various churches. He also traveled to Turin to paint in the palace of the Marchese de Pianezza.  He also painted in Bergamo.  A Last Supper originally painted for St. Thomas Apostle, was found in the museum of Verona.  He painted a Holy family with Saints Anne, young John the Baptist, and Donor Dal Pozzo for the apse of the church of San Lorenzo, Verona (likely copy of an earlier Raphael). His son, Michelangelo Prunati was also a painter. Among his pupils was Antonio Mela, Felice Torelli, Giovanni Battista Rubini (painter), Felice Cappelletti, Bartolomeo Signorini, Paolo Panelli (painter), and his most famous pupil Gian Bettino Cignaroli

References

Sources

 Church of San Lorenzo of Verona

External links

1650s births
1728 deaths
17th-century Italian painters
Italian male painters
18th-century Italian painters
Italian Baroque painters
Painters from Verona
18th-century Italian male artists